Inmarsat S/Hellas Sat 3 is a satellite owned by Hellas Sat. It was launched (on an Ariane 5 rocket) on 28 June 2017, 21:15 UTC to replace the Hellas Sat 2 satellite.

References

External links 

Communications satellites in geostationary orbit
Intelsat satellites
Satellites of Greece
Spacecraft launched in 2017
2017 in Greece
Satellites using the Spacebus bus
Ariane commercial payloads